The Funicular Railway Upper City - Lower City (Italian: Funicolare Città Alta), is a funicular railway line in the city of Bergamo, Italy. It connects the historic core of Città Alta (the suspended fortified city of Bergamo built up on a hill) with the Città Bassa, the financial lower city. Built in 1887, it is one of the two funicular lines serving the city of Bergamo; the other being the Bergamo - San Vigilio funicular.

Features 
The twin track funicular railway of Bergamo owns a peculiarity: the tracks have different lengths (right 240 m and left 234 m). The difference in height is 85 meters, with a maximum gradient of 52%.

The lower funicular station, located at 271 meters m.s.l. is served by the ATB bus network, as well as the one at the high city, which is 356 meters m.s.l. The journey time is 2 minute. The lower station is called Lower Town of Bergamo (Italian: Città Bassa di Bergamo), the upper being Bergamo Upper Town (Italian: Città Alta di Bergamo).

References

Funicular railways in Italy
Transport in Bergamo
Railway lines in Lombardy